Janez Pleteršek (born 19 June 1960 in Maribor) is a Slovenian former alpine skier who competed for Yugoslavia in the 1984 Winter Olympics, finishing 27th in the men's downhill.

External links
 sports-reference.com
 

1960 births
Living people
Slovenian male alpine skiers
Olympic alpine skiers of Yugoslavia
Alpine skiers at the 1984 Winter Olympics
Sportspeople from Maribor
20th-century Slovenian people